Kids is a song by Swedish DJ Style of Eye, featuring Soso and an uncredited appearance from Elliphant. Released on December 10, 2013 worldwide (excluding the United Kingdom), it was his fourth and final single of 2013. In the United Kingdom, it was released on March 16, 2014.

"Kids" peaked at 33 in Sweden and 76 in Germany.

Release history

References

2013 singles
2013 songs
Electronic songs
Elliphant songs
Sony Music singles
Songs written by Elliphant